Sylvia Leticia Martínez Elizondo (20 November 1947 – 9 July 2020) was a Mexican politician.  She was a member of the National Action Party. She was Senator during the LXIII Legislature of the Mexican Congress from 2016 until 2018.

Martínez Elizondo died in Monterrey on 9 July 2020, aged 72.

References

1947 births
2020 deaths
Members of the Senate of the Republic (Mexico)
Women members of the Senate of the Republic (Mexico)
National Action Party (Mexico) politicians
People from Chihuahua City
21st-century Mexican politicians
21st-century Mexican women politicians
Politicians from Chihuahua (state)